Enos Michael House, also known as the Michael-Sullins House, is a historic home located 
in Fremont, Steuben County, Indiana. It was built in 1848, and is a -story, rectangular, five bay, Greek Revival style frame dwelling.  It sits on a cut stone foundation and has a side gable roof. A rear addition was built about 1920. It features a recently added one-bay, central entrance portico.

It was listed on the National Register of Historic Places in 1982.

References

Houses on the National Register of Historic Places in Indiana
Greek Revival houses in Indiana
Houses completed in 1848
Buildings and structures in Steuben County, Indiana
National Register of Historic Places in Steuben County, Indiana